Drillia rimata is a species of sea snail, a marine gastropod mollusk in the family Drilliidae.

Description
The shell grows to a length of 31 mm; its diameter 9 mm.

Distribution

References

 Tucker, J.K. 2004 "Catalog of recent and fossil turrids (Mollusca: Gastropoda)". Zootaxa 682:1–1295

External links
 

rimata
Gastropods described in 1888